Dioryctria cibriani is a species of snout moth in the genus Dioryctria. It was described by Akira Mutuura and Herbert H. Neunzig in 1986 and is known from Mexico.

The wingspan is 23–29 mm. The forewings have a brown background colour with silvery iridescent white or grey, reddish-brown and pink scales. The hindwings are grey and darker along the posterior margin. Adults have been recorded in March, July and August suggesting at least two generations per year.

The larvae feed on Pinus leiophylla, Pinus maximinoi and Pinus oocarpa. They attack cones that have begun their second year of growth, boring across scales, seeds, and
axis. A resin blister is formed on the cone surface or peduncle. This contains frass. The larvae are orange brown with dark grey shading.

Etymology
The species is named after biologist David Cibrian-Tovar.

References

Moths described in 1986
cibriani